Francis Goya (born François Edouard Weyer; 16 May 1946) is a Belgian classical guitar player and producer. He has recorded fifty albums, many of which have reached gold or platinum status. Francis went solo in 1975, changing his name to Goya. His first solo single, Nostalgia, became an international hit, reaching the top ten in Belgium and the Netherlands.

Biography 

Born to a family of musicians, he took a guitar in his hands for the first time at the age of 12.
At 16, Francis Goya formed his first group (Les Jivaros) together with his brother who played the percussion, and several friends.
In 1966 he became acquainted with Lou Deprijck, who joined Francis’ rock group,  (Later, Lou was a producer for Plastic Bertrand and composed for him the song
Ça plane pour moi which gained success all over the world).
In 1970 Francis Goya was invited to a professional soul music group J J Band, with which he recorded two albums, the second of them produced by  Brian Bennett,
This LP was recorded in London for CBS. Thanks to J J Band, Francis Goya took part in a tour over Europe and Africa.
He also became a studio guitar player, and played on the stage with performers of different styles, such as Demis Roussos, Vicky Leandros, and others.

Nostalgia 

In 1975, he released his first solo LP Nostalgia, which quickly reached top positions in the charts. Nostalgia was a tender and romantic melody written by Francis Goya and his father. That was the beginning of his international career.
Francis Goya tours with his performances all over the world, from Asia to Latin America, South Africa, Russia etc.
Between the tours, he records at least one new album; their number has already reached 35 LPs and CDs, and most of them have the status of a gold disc or platinum disc.
As of today, Francis Goya has sold over millions of his albums all over the world; this is quite a rare case for instrumental music.
Francis Goya directed the Eurovision orchestra in Rome in 1991 and in Millstreet in 1993 during the Luxembourgish performances.

Latin American influence 

Francis Goya has always admired Latin American music. In 1991, he decided to record, concurrently with instrumental music, a CD containing Brazilian songs. The timbre of his voice and passionate guitar-playing turned out to be a marvelous combination, and the public liked it.
He decided to continue working in this way, and, in 1992 and 1993 released two new albums of the same style ( and Festival Latino).
1994 was the year for “going back to the roots”, for releasing a new CD of instrumental music, and for a tour of over fifty concerts in the Netherlands.
In 1998 Francis Goya recorded beautiful songs of Jacques Brel, these were released on a CD and distributed all over Europe. Later, a duet album with Richard Clayderman was recorded.

Wind from the East 

The  which was recorded in Moscow, was released in 1981 in all countries of the former Soviet Union, and won enormous success; this allowed Francis Goya to become a West-European star in Eastern Europe.

March 2001: first concerts in Estonia 

After twenty years of success in Eastern Europe, in 2001, Francis Goya was invited to give a concert in Estonia in the Tallinn Philharmonic Hall, with accompaniment of the Chamber Orchestra of the Philharmonic Hall, directed by Jean-Luc Drion, a pianist and a director, who had, by the time, been a friend of Francis Goya for 30 years.
The first concert was such a success that Francis Goya had to prolong his stay in Estonia and give a second concert on the following day in the same Philharmonic Hall.
After such first experience in Estonia, Francis Goya decided to record an instrumental album that included pieces by the great Estonian composer Raimond Valgre.
That album was also a huge success in Estonia.
Furthermore, the Russian album entitled  which was recorded in Saint Petersburg was widely distributed in Korea, Taiwan and China.

Due to his popularity, Francis Goya regularly goes on tours all over the world, and the public receives every concert with exceptional enthusiasm:

 April 2004: A concert in Saint Petersburg (Russia)
 October 2005: Palais des Beaux Arts in Brussels (Belgium)
 March 2006: A concert in the Philharmonic Hall, Saint Petersburg (Russia)
 April 2006: A concert at Abbaye de Forest in Brussels (Belgium)
 May 2006: A tour of three concerts in Poland (Poznań, Kraków, and Warsaw)
 May 2006: Participation in Braine-l'Alleud Festival (Belgium). Et si on se faisait plaisir
 June 2006: Recording an album specially for China
 September 2006: A concert in l’Église St Étienne in Braine l’Alleud
 November 2006: A grand tour over the Baltic countries
 December 2006: concert in the Oktyabrsky Concert Hall in Saint Petersburg (Russia).
 March 2007: Concerts in Tallinn (Estonia), Vilnius (Lithuania), Riga (Latvia), Valmiera (Latvia), Tartu (Estonia), and Pärnu (Estonia)
 April 2007: A grand concert in Moscow
 May 2007: A gala concert in Cambodia for the benefit of humanitarian organizations (Lions Club)
 May 2007: A concert at the World of Guitar Festival in Kaluga (Russia)
 September 2007: A concert in Waterloo (Belgium)
 October 2007: A concert for the benefit of St Michel Oncological Charity Foundation in Nivelles (Belgium)
 October 2007: A grand tour over Russia
 March 2012: Concerts in Vilnius (Lithuania), Tallinn (Estonia), Riga (Latvia), Moscow, Saintt Petersburg, Tyumen, Omsk, Novosibirsk, Ekaterinburg, Izhevsk and Kirov (Russia).
 March 2013: On the occasion of Women's Day, two concerts "Romantic Guitar" 7 in Saint Petersburg Russia, 8 in Tallinn Estonia
 18 September 2013, Concert in Shenzhen, China
 June 2014: Concert in Sardegna with Charles Aznavour
 November 2014: Concert tour in Siberia, KHABAROVSK, YU-SAKHALINSK, VLADIVOSTOK, PETROPAVLOVSK-KAMCHATSKIY
 May 2015 : Ukrainian and Bellarussia concert tour.
 September 2015: Bulgaria
 April 2016 : Israel
 October 2016 : Belgium
 September 2016 Marrakech - Morocco
 November 2016, Ukraine and Russia
 The concerts continue.
 August 2021, Estonia, Lithuania
 May, 2022, Finland
 Upcoming concerts.
 December 9 and 11, 2022 in New York

In 2006, rapper Busta Rhymes reproduced a sample from Francis Goya's old work Faded Lady, which became No.1 on the USA Top-100 under the title of "New York Shit" (album The Big Bang)

In January 2008, Francis Goya and his family decided to move to Marrakesh (Morocco). Francis Goya continued giving gala concerts in Canada, South Africa, Russia, and Estonia.

In 2010, Francis Goya opened his first musical school Ateliers Art et Musique (Art and Music Studio) in Marrakesh.

In 2011, he established the Francis Goya Foundation for cultural development of Moroccan children and teenagers from “problem” regions Site officiel de la Fondation Francis Goya  with the assistance of the Belgian Ambassador to Morocco, Consul of Belgium in Morocco, and high officials of the State of Morocco.

2012: A grand tour over the major cities of the Baltic countries and Russia is planned.

Atelier Art et Musique (Art and Music Studio) in Marrakesh (Morocco) 
The school is dedicated to love of arts and music. l'Atelier Art & Musique Francis Goya.
On the initiative of Francis Goya and his daughter Valérie, who also works for the Foundation, l'Atelier Art & Musique Francis Goya was established on 8 March 2010. Moral support of the Consulate of Belgium and Prefecture of Marrakesh and partnership with Yamaha, allowed commencing studies in instrumental and vocal disciplines.
Francis Goya provides classes for everyone, from beginners to mature musicians, and in everything, from musical development to solfeggio, including multivarious classes in playing the guitar, the piano, and the violin, and classes of magic, dancing, and singing. And indeed, over a hundred students of various levels enrolled for various courses, thus displaying a vivid interest towards their school.

Francis Goya Foundation for cultural development of children and teenagers from “problem” regions 
Francis Goya Foundation  : Art and music for destitute children all over the world.

Throughout his entire long career as a composer and a musician, Francis Goya has always taken part in charity campaigns aimed at collecting donations for the financing of orphanages and secondary schools in Cambodia, the department of urgent pediatrics of the Queen Fabiola Hospital (l’Hôpital Reine Fabiola) in Belgium, and Saint Michel Oncological Foundation in Brussels. When Francis Goya moved, a long time ago, to Morocco he saw that development of Moroccan young population needs support.

A brilliant idea occurred to him when he was traveling over the south regions of the country. He was playing the guitar, with his family around him, at a bivouac near a small village, when suddenly a crowd of children ringed round him and started listening too.
The idea was developed further: Francis decided to establish a Foundation for revealing of new talents among children and teenagers from “problem” regions and helping them develop their musical talents.
To establish the Francis Goya Foundation , support has been received from Francis Goya's Moroccan and European friends, who share the same values. The approach consists in arranging free concerts in order to collect funds to buy musical instruments and to finance singing and dancing classes for children. Schools, orphanages, and mountain regions are visited in order to discover young talents who would benefit from serious musical classes and gain and opportunity of studying abroad, and to find those who need long-term control and assistance.
“When life is generous to us, there comes time to give and time to serve – the more so, because music makes hearts warmer.
Today is an important day: we are laying the first stone to the base of the edifice, and we would like to use this opportunity to appeal to generosity of the donators for the financing of our ambitious projects, such as donation of musical instruments or taking the charge of conducting
artistic classes for children and teenagers from “problem” regions (such as orphanages, hospitals, douars).
I would like to thank you in advance for the coverage and publicity that you can give to this good initiative” – the speech of Francis Goya, President of the Francis Goya Foundation 

Francis Goya has over 40 album releases to his credit.

Discography

Singles 

 1975 - "Nostalgia"/"Nautilus" 
 1976 - "Concierto d'Aranjuez"/"Lovers melody" 
 1976 - "Maria Padilha"/"Daddy's bolero"
 1976 - "Caf'Conc'" (aka "Cafe Concerto")/"Tangoya" 
 1977 - "Gipsy Wedding"
 1978 - "Argentina"/"Natasha" 
 1978 - "Manolita"/"Natasha" 
 1981 - "Moscow nights"/"Song of the Dnjepr"

Albums
 1975 - Nostalgia 
 1976 - Maria Padhila - (retitled Francis Goya 2 in some territories)
 1977 - Sweet & Softly 
 1978 - Argentina - (retitled 16 Gouden Successen in some territories and 16 Droommelodieën in others, and released on CD as Melodies of Love in 1987)
 1978 - Christmas Party - (released on CD as We Wish You a Merry Christmas in 1988 and Hollands Glorie Kerst in 2002)
 1979 - Souvenirs aus Griechenland (with Les Helleniques) 
 1979 - Summernight Moods 
 1979 - Guitarra Romantica - (retitled Spaanse Romantiek in some territories - with 4 songs removed)
 1979 - Goya By Candlelight - 20 Romantic Hits - (released on CD as Romantic Guitar of Francis Goya in 1985)
 1980 - Italia Romantica 
 1980 - Moscow Nights 
 1981 - Pohjolan Yössä 
 1982 - Symphony of Love 
 1983 - Quiet Moments: 28 Instrumental Songs of Love (with Solitaire Orchestra) 
 1985 - Concerto For My Love (with Damian Luca) - (retitled Romantic Gala in some territories)
 1986 - This is Francis Goya - (retitled The Sound of Francis Goya in some territories)
 1986 - Romantic Moods
 1987 - Concierto (with Laurens Van Rooyen) 
 1988 - Rendez-vous 
 1990 - Plays His Favourite Hits Vol.1 
 1990 - Bahia Lady (with Carmina Cabrera) 
 1991 - Magic Dreams (with the Norman Candler Strings) - all 10 songs originally appeared on the 12-song LP More Than Ever (year unknown)
 1993 - Noche Latino (with Carmina Cabrera) 
 1994 - Festival Latino (with Carmina Cabrera) 
 1994 - The Very Best of 
 1994 - Together (with Peter Weekers) - (retitled The Hi-Fi Sound in some territories)
 1996 - Gondwana 
 1998 - Jacques Brel 
 1998 - Plays His Favourite Hits Vol. 2 
 1999 - Francis Goya in Moscow
 1999 - Latin Romance 
1999 - Kesäunelmia
 1999 - Best of Francis Goya 
 2000 - Together (with Richard Clayderman) - (reissued as Face to Face in 2005)
 2000 - De Mooiste Sfeermelodieën 
 2001 - Pleased to meet You, Mr. Valgre 
 2002 - Hollands Glorie 
 2002 - A tribute to Alexandra Pakhmutova 
 2003 - Klassieke Droommelodieën 
 2003 - Mystical Reflexions 
 2004 - Rakkaudella 
 2004 - Intimité (with Jean-Luc Drion)
 2004 - Magic Moments 
 2004 - Tribute To Canadian Composers (Richard Abel & Francis Goya) 
 2004 - Grand Collection 
 2008 - Wings for life
 2019 - Kochak
 2019 - Classical Dreams Melodies

Others
 MTV Music History (Year not listed)
 Greatest Hits (Year not listed)
 Emotions (Year not listed)

External links

  
    Francis Goya Foundation
   Atelier Arts et Musique
  Francis Goya at the Belgian Pop & Rock Archives

References

1946 births
Living people
Belgian rock guitarists
Belgian songwriters
Male songwriters
Easy listening musicians
Eurovision Song Contest conductors
21st-century conductors (music)
21st-century male musicians